The wearing of academic scarves is a tradition found at many colleges and universities in English-speaking countries, and particularly in the United Kingdom and Ireland. Sets of two or more coloured stripes have traditionally been used as part of the distinctive visual identity of these institutions. The scarves are usually made of Saxony wool and traditionally 6 feet (c. 2m) long.

The colours are often derived from the colours of the official coat of arms and/or the varsity colours, and are used in clothing and symbols of all kinds, from ties to trophies, but notably in the long woollen winter scarves that students and alumni wear to show their pride in their institutions. Some universities have different scarves for different faculties and even for undergraduates and postgraduates. Some may even have a 'combination scarf' where one side is in the university's colours and the other the faculty, etc. colours. Traditionally, academic scarves would not have further embroidery on them, such as arms or logos, as the stripes are sufficient to identify the scarf's origins and affiliation; however, at some universities such as Cambridge it has become usual for scarves to be embroidered with the college arms. Furthermore, universities might change their design and colours from time to time, usually during re-branding exercises, or if there isn't an 'official' version that has been widely used.

At some universities, in addition to collegiate scarves, there are also several non-collegiate scarves which have a well-established meaning. For example, those representing the university in sport may be entitled to wear a particular scarf, depending on their level of achievement, or a university department or club may have its own scarf. In addition, some colleges and universities have (for example) separate scarves for senior clubs such as their Boat Clubs.

Academic scarves are to be distinguished from other types of scarves that are officially sold by the institution themselves which often use different colours and are embroidered with logos and other emblem, or designed/made differently to traditional academic scarves.

Australia

La Trobe University

University of Adelaide

University of Melbourne

University of New England

University of New South Wales

University of Queensland

University of Sydney

University of Tasmania

Canada

Ireland

University of Dublin

National University of Ireland

University College Dublin

Other NUI Constituent Universities

University of Limerick

Dublin City University

New Zealand

University of Otago

The term scarfies is often used in and around Dunedin, the site of the University of Otago, as a slang term for university students.

United Kingdom

University of Birmingham

University of Bristol

University of Cambridge

Sports colours

Durham University

University of Glasgow

Imperial College London

Lancaster University

University of London

Newcastle University

University of Oxford

Sports colours

Queen's University Belfast

University of St Andrews

University of Wales

University of York

Scarf colours of other UK universities

Scarf colours of former UK universities

United States

Harvard University

Yale University

Academic scarves of other American colleges

Scarf colors of US High Schools

See also

List of rowing blades – School and university

Notes

References

Traditions by university or college
British clothing
Academic dress
Scarves